Granita (in Italian also granita siciliana ) is a semi-frozen dessert made from sugar, water and various flavorings. Originally from Sicily, it is available throughout Italy in varying forms. It is related to sorbet and Italian ice; however, in most of Sicily, it has a smoother, more crystalline texture. Food writer Jeffrey Steingarten says that "the desired texture seems to vary from city to city" on the island; on the west coast and in Palermo, it is at its chunkiest, and in the east, it is nearly as smooth as sorbet. This is largely the result of different freezing techniques: the smoother types are produced in a gelato machine, while the coarser varieties are frozen with only occasional agitation, then scraped or shaved to produce separated crystals. Although its texture varies from coarse to smooth, it is always different from that of ice cream, which is creamier, and from that of sorbet, which is more compact; this makes granita distinct and unique.

Ingredients

Common and traditional flavoring ingredients include lemon juice, mandarin oranges, jasmine, coffee, almonds, mint, and when in season wild strawberries and black mulberries. Chocolate granitas have a tradition in the city of Catania but are also available in other parts of Sicily. The nuances of the Sicilian ingredients are important to the flavor of the finished granita: Sicilian lemons are a less acidic, more floral variety similar to Meyer lemons, while the almonds used contain a proportion of bitter almonds, crucial to the signature almond flavor. Another popular granita flavor is pistachio, an agricultural product of Sicily.

Serving conventions

Granita with coffee is very common in the city of Messina, while granita with almonds is popular in the city of Catania. Granita, in combination with a warm pastry, called brioche, is a common breakfast in summertime (the Sicilian brioche is generally flatter and wider than the French version).

See also

 Shaved ice § Regions, for similar shaved ice variations worldwide.
 Custard
 Ice cream
 Italian ice
 Snow cone
 Gelato

References

Italian desserts
Frozen desserts
Cuisine of Sicily
Sorbets